The 2007 German motorcycle Grand Prix was the tenth round of the 2007 MotoGP championship.  It took place on the weekend of 13–15 July 2007 at the Sachsenring in Hohenstein-Ernstthal, Germany.

MotoGP classification

250 cc classification

125 cc classification

Championship standings after the race (MotoGP)

Below are the standings for the top five riders and constructors after round ten has concluded. 

Riders' Championship standings

Constructors' Championship standings

 Note: Only the top five positions are included for both sets of standings.

References

German motorcycle Grand Prix
German
Motorcycle Grand Prix